Netrokona Sadar is an upazila (sub-district) of Netrokona District under Mymensingh Division, Bangladesh.

Geography
It has 51039 households and total area 340.35 km2. The upazila is bounded by Durgapur and Kalmakanda upazilas on the north, Kendua and Gauripur upazilas on the south, Barhatta and Atpara upazilas on the east, Purbadhala upazila on the west.

History

Present-day Netrokona Sadar was ruled by a Koch king named Ganesh. The area was introduced to Islam by an 11th-century preacher by the name of Shah Sultan Rumi who arrived in 1053 CE. After gaining the king's respect, Rumi was given a few villages, in particular Madanpur, as a rent-free area. Rumi was buried in Madanpur in 1075.

In opposition to Company rule in India, a group of rebels known as the Pagal Panthis emerged in Greater Mymensingh in 1764 lasting up until 1852. Natorkona was one of the main locations effected by the Pagal Panthis. In response, a police outpost (thana) was set up by the British officers at Natorkona to assist their allied zamindars in suppressing the Pagal Panthi revolt. It is said that when the Pagal Panthis looted the outpost, the officers relocated to Kaliganj Bazar in Satpai mouza which is the site of the present Netrokona Sadar police station. However, the name of the thana remained as Natorkona, later being corrupted to Netrokona.

In 1829, the British East India Company tried to takeover the Shah Sultan Rumi estate. This was contested by the guardians of the shrine who provided an old Persian document dating from 1082 CE. In response, the government abandoned the plan and granted the estate to the document holder; Syed Jalaluddin. Netrokona was made a thana in 1938 and made the capital of Netrokona Mahakuma in 1882.

Amidst the Indian independence movement, influential nationalist Subhas Chandra Bose gave a speech at the Methar Patti grounds on 15 March 1939. The All India Peasant Conference was held from 8 to 10 April 1945 at the Parar grounds. During the Bangladesh Liberation War, the Pakistan Army captured 4 people and shot them dead at the Trimohani Bridge on29 April 1971. A battle took place on 9 December leading to the death of three freedom fighters. The Pakistani army was finally defeated in Netrokona Sadar in a last encounter at the Agricultural Farm where two freedom fighters were also killed. In 1983, the Netrokona thana was upgraded to an upazila and it was made the capital of the Netrokona District in 1984.

Demographics

According to 2011 Bangladesh census, Netrakona Sadar had a population of 372,785. Males constituted 50.17% of the population and females 49.83%. Muslims formed 90.33% of the population, Hindus 9.61%, Christians 0.03% and others 0.03%. Netrakona Sadar had a literacy rate of 45.97% for the population 7 years and above.

As of the 1991 Bangladesh census, Netrakona Sadar has a population of 265643. Males constitute 51.36% of the population, and females 48.64%. This Upazila's eighteen up population is 134197. Netrakona Sadar has an average literacy rate of 28.4% (7+ years), and a national average of 32.4% literate.

Administration
Netrokona Thana was formed in 1874 and it was turned into an upazila in 1983.

Netrakona Sadar Upazila is divided into Netrakona Municipality and 12 union parishads: Amtala, Challisha, Dakshin Bishiura, Kailati, Kaliara Gabragati, Lokkhiganj, Madanpur, Medni, Maugati, Rauha, Singhar Bangla, and Thakurakona. The union parishads are subdivided into 255 mauzas and 332 villages.

Netrakona Municipality is subdivided into 9 wards and 51 mahallas.

Upazila chairmen

Notable people
Abu Abbas (d. 2009), politician
Mujibur Rahman Khan (1910-1984), journalist and litterateur 
Rashid Uddin (1889-1964), Baul mystic
Shah Sultan Rumi (d. 1075), Muslim missionary

See also
Upazilas of Bangladesh
Districts of Bangladesh
Divisions of Bangladesh

References

Upazilas of Netrokona District